Southern Ashe is an American Southern Rock/Country Rock Band from Columbus, Georgia. They have toured with Wet Willie, Stillwater and Wild Cherry, and performed as a supporting act to artists such as Rush, The J. Geils Band, Joe Cocker, Alabama, Ronnie Milsap, Merle Haggard, Jerry Reed, Hank Williams Jr., Vince Gill, John Anderson and others. They are best known for their song "Paradise", which was co-produced by Leon Everette and reached #80 on the Billboard Country chart in August 1981.

Band members

Current
 Jeff Fredrick - guitar, keyboard, vocals
 Steve Westmoreland - guitar
 Keith Stewart - guitar, vocals
 Robert Earl Lowery - bass
 Alan Hussey - drums
 Jeff Greer - drums, vocals

Former
 Terry Young
 Rud King
 Tony Stephens
 Jimmy Pope
 Robert Earl Lowery
 Mike McLain
 Duke Vaughn
 Gil Milligan
 Mike Funk
 Ben Cross

Discography

Studio albums
 Highway Cowboy (1979)
 "Highway Cowboy" (Fredrick, McLain) 3:14
 "Love Stumblin' Blues" (Stephens) 3:04
 "Pizza, Beer, and Rock 'n Roll" (Welch, Fredrick ) 3:22
 "Tell Me" (Stephens) 4:20
 "Love Games" (Pope) 3:17
 "Apple Cider Sally" (Welch, Stephens)
 "Rockin' the South" (Fredrick, Pope)
 "Sweet Anne" (Fredrick)
 "Last Train" (Fredrick, McLain)
 "Rock 'n Roll Lovers" (Stephens, McLain)

Singles

 "Paradise" (1981) (B-side: Loving On A Three-Way Street)
 "Showdown" (1981)
 "Real Woman" (1982)

References 

American country rock groups
Rock music groups from Georgia (U.S. state)